El Khasos is a city in Cairo Governorate, Egypt.

Populated places in Cairo Governorate